Hans-Christian Huf (born 1956 in Starnberg) is a German author, historian and television journalist.

Huf studied German studies, history and politics in Munich, Germany and Bordeaux in France. Since 1984 he's an employee of the public-service German television channel ZDF. Since 1987 he's part of the editorial staff from the ZDF-editorial Geschichte und Gesellschaft (history and society) and Kultur und Gesellschaft (culture and society).

References

External links 
 Books from and about Hans-Christian Huf in the catalog of the German national library (German)

1956 births
Living people
20th-century German historians
German television presenters
German male non-fiction writers
ZDF people
21st-century German historians